Carl Isioma Ihenacho (born May 28, 1988) is a former American football linebacker. He played college football at San Jose State.

High school career
Carl Ihenacho was born in Carson, California and is of Nigerian descent.  Although Ihenacho's mother did not allow Carl or his younger brother Duke to play Pop Warner football, Duke Ihenacho joined the football team at Junipero Serra High School at Gardena, California in senior year.  At Serra, Carl Ihenacho played the defensive end and tight end positions. Ihenacho was also a second-team all-league pick and his team's Rookie of the Year in 2005.

College career
Ihenacho played at San Jose State University and started 31 games.  He was a two-time second-team All-Western Athletic Conference honoree during his four seasons at San Jose State.  He ranks number five on the university’s career list for tackles for loss (33.5) and is tied for fifth in quarterback sacks with 17.  In December 2009, he graduated one semester early with a bachelor's degree in psychology. Carl Ihenacho played at San Jose State with his younger brother  Duke Ihenacho from the 2007 to 2009 seasons. In 2008, ESPN ranked Carl and Duke Ihenacho as one of the top ten brother combinations in college football for being among the top defensive players in FBS football.

Professional career

On January 26, 2011, Ihenacho signed a reserve/future contract with the San Diego Chargers.  Ihenacho participated in training camp with the Chargers until being waived on September 3, 2011. On December 7, 2011, Ihenacho signed with the Oakland Raiders practice squad.

Ihenacho debuted professionally in Week 1 of the 2012 season (September 10), a Monday Night Football game and 22-14 home loss to the San Diego Chargers. In Week 2 (September 16), a 35-13 loss to the Miami Dolphins, Ihenacho recorded his first tackle as a professional.

On September 25, 2012, the Raiders waived Ihenacho, but re-signed him to the practice squad two days later. On October 2, 2012, the Raiders cut Ihenacho.

Ihenacho retired from football to become a personal trainer after being released.

References

External links
 Oakland Raiders bio
 San Jose State Spartans bio
 NFL combine results

1988 births
Living people
Nigerian players of American football
American football linebackers
American sportspeople of Nigerian descent
Oakland Raiders players
People from Carson, California
Players of American football from California
San Jose State Spartans football players
Sportspeople from Los Angeles County, California
American exercise instructors